Inishloe or Low Island (Gaeilge: Inis Lua) is an uninhabited island in the River Fergus and townland in the Kildysart parish of County Clare, Ireland.

Geography 
The island's surface area is 52.68 hectares (130 acres).

Demographics 
It has been uninhabited since 1976 however the 1901 census showed 43 inhabitants which reduced to 32 in 1911.

The table reports data taken from Discover the Islands of Ireland (Alex Ritsema, Collins Press, 1999) and the Census of Ireland.

References

Uninhabited islands of Ireland
Islands of County Clare
River islands of Ireland